Marco Chiudinelli and Frank Moser were the defending champions but chose not to defend their title.

Wesley Koolhof and Matwé Middelkoop won the title after defeating Roman Jebavý and Zdeněk Kolář 6–3, 6–3 in the final.

Seeds

Draw

References
 Main Draw

Internazionali di Tennis Castel del Monte - Doubles
2016 Doubles
2016 in Italian tennis